Ann Khozine (Anna Khozina; born 18 June 1998), known by her ring name Masha Slamovich, is a Russian-American professional wrestler currently signed to Impact Wrestling. She also wrestles for Game Changer Wrestling (GCW), where she is the current GCW World Champion in her first reign.

Early life 
Ann Khozine was born in Moscow, Russia and has dual U.S. and Russian citizenship. Khozine began training as a professional wrestler at age 16, training under Johnny Rodz. In 2021, she earned a degree in criminal justice.

Professional wrestling career

Independent circuit (2016–present) 
In 2016, Khozine made her in-ring debut in Reina, an independent women's professional wrestling promotion in Japan. She wrestled under the ring name Skinripper. In February 2020, she returned to Japan and trained in the Marvelous Dojo under Chigusa Nagayo.

In 2019 and 2022, Slamovich competed for the Russian Independent Wrestling Federation (IWF). She lost to Ivan Markov in an intergender match at IWF Strike 119, which aired on 10 February 2022.

On 2 January 2023 at Game Changer Wrestling (GCW)'s 56 Nights, Slamovich defeated Cole Radrick, later that night she won a "Do or Die" battle royal match to become the No. 1 contender for the GCW World Championship. On 17 March, Slamovich defeated Nick Gage at Eye for an Eye to win the GCW World Championship.

Impact Wrestling (2019; 2021–present) 
Slamovich made her first appearance for Impact Wrestling during the 2019 June 14 episode of Impact! where she lost to Havok. She also appeared on the 29 June  episode of Xplosion where she was defeated by Jordynne Grace. Slamovich made her return to Impact Wrestling on 17 September 2021, during the Knockouts Knockdown event, where she unsuccessfully challenged Deonna Purrazzo, who was the AAA Reina de Reinas Champion and Impact Knockouts World Champion at the time, in a non-titles match. After impressing Impact Wrestling officials, Hall of Famer Gail Kim came out after the match in an unaired segment and offered Slamovich a contract with the promotion.

Throughout the first half of 2022, Slamovich went on an undefeated streak as she defeated various jobbers and contracted Knockouts such as Alisha and Havok. On the 1 September episode of Impact!, in the main event match, Slamovich defeated Deonna Purrazzo to become the No. 1 contender for the Impact Knockouts World Championship, which was held by Jordynne Grace. Slamovich challenged Grace for the title on 7 October at Bound for Glory, but was unsuccessful, thus ending her winning streak.

On 13 January 2023, at Hard To Kill, Slamovich defeated Deonna Purrazzo, Killer Kelly, and Taylor Wilde in a four-way match to become the No. 1 contender for the Impact Knockouts World Championship.

Expect The Unexpected Wrestling (2021–present) 
On 3 December 2021, Slamovich made her debut for Expect The Unexpected Wrestling (ETU), being defeated by Billie Starkz. On 9 September 2022, she competed in a one night, ten wrestler tournament to crown the first ever ETU Keys To The East Champion. The tournament also included Mike Bailey, Akira, Alec Price, Gabriel Skye, Brandon Kirk, Scoot Andrews, Danny Demanto, Marcus Mathers, and Matt Tremont. Masha defeated Brandon Kirk in the first round, followed by a victory over Mike Bailey in the semi-finals. Slamovich defeated Marcus Mathers in the tournament final to be crowned the inaugural champion.

Championships and accomplishments
AAW: Professional Wrestling Redefined
AAW Women's Championship (1 time, current)
 Combat Fights Unlimited
 CFU Undisputed Championship (1 time, current)
 Expect The Unexpected Wrestling
 ETU Keys To The East Championship (1 time, current, inaugural)
 ETU Keys To The East Championship Tournament (2022) 
Game Changer Wrestling 
 GCW World Championship (1 time, current)
Do or Die Battle Royal (2023)
 Global Syndicate Wrestling
 GSW Women's World Championship (1 time, current)
 GSW Soul of Syndicate Championship (1 time)
 Lucha Memes
Battle of Coacalco (2022)
 Pro Wrestling Illustrated
 Ranked No. 14 of the top 150 female wrestlers in the PWI Women's 150 in 2022
Ranked No. 110 of the top 500 singles wrestlers in the PWI 500 in 2022
 Sports Illustrated
 Ranked No. 10 of the top 10 wrestlers in 2022
Top Talent Wrestling
TTW Championship (1 time, current)
 Victory Pro Wrestling
 VPW Women's Championship (1 time)
 West Coast Pro Wrestling
West Coast Pro Women's Championship (1 time, current)

References

External links 

 

1998 births
Living people
Sportspeople from New York City
Sportspeople from Moscow
21st-century professional wrestlers
American female professional wrestlers
Professional wrestlers from New York (state)
Russian emigrants to the United States
Russian female professional wrestlers